Season 1998-99 saw Livingston compete in the Scottish Second Division. They also competed in the League Cup and the Scottish Cup.

Summary
Livingston won the Scottish Second Division and were promoted. They reached the 3rd round of the league cup and the 4th round of the Scottish Cup.

Results & fixtures

Second Division

League Cup

Scottish Cup

Statistics

League table

References

Livingston
Livingston F.C. seasons